The following is a list of the power stations in Myanmar.

Coal

Gas

Hydroelectric

See also

Energy in Myanmar
List of largest power stations in the world

References

Myanmar
Economy of Myanmar-related lists
Power stations in Myanmar
Power stations